Reuben Eldridge Truax (October 11, 1847 – April 3, 1935) was an Ontario businessman and political figure. He represented Bruce South in the Legislative Assembly of Ontario from 1894 to 1904 and from 1908 to 1911 and Bruce East in 1891 and Bruce South from 1913 to 1921 in the House of Commons of Canada as a Liberal member. Truax served four years as reeve and was mayor of Walkerton, Ontario in 1888 and 1889.

He was born in Montreal, Canada East in 1847 and educated in Walkerton, Ontario. In 1870, he married Jessie Porteous. He owned a sawmill, planing mill and sash and door factory. He was first elected to the House of Commons in 1891 but that election was declared invalid and Henry Cargill was elected by acclamation in the by-election which followed. Truax was an unsuccessful candidate for the federal seat in Bruce South in 1911 and 1921.

External links 

The Canadian parliamentary companion, 1897 JA Gemmill
The History of the County of Bruce and of the minor municipalities therein ..., N Robertson (1906)
A History of Ontario : its resources and development. Part II., A Fraser (1909)

1847 births
1935 deaths
Ontario Liberal Party MPPs
Liberal Party of Canada MPs
Mayors of places in Ontario
Members of the House of Commons of Canada from Ontario